Carroll station is a light rail station on the Muni Metro T Third Street line, located in the median of Third Street in the Bayview neighborhood of San Francisco, California. The station opened with the T Third Street line on January 13, 2007. It has two side platforms; the northbound platform is north of Carroll Avenue, and the southbound platform south of Carroll Avenue, so that trains can pass through the intersection before the station stop.

References

External links 
SFMTA: Third Street & Carroll Ave northbound, southbound
SF Bay Transit (unofficial): Third Street & Carroll Ave

Muni Metro stations
Railway stations in the United States opened in 2007